Belmond Nsumbu Dituabanza (born 31 January 1982) is a retired Congolese football defender.

He was a member of the Congolese 2006 African Nations Cup team, who progressed to the quarter finals, where they were eliminated by Egypt, who eventually won the tournament.

External links

Profile at Fupa.net

Living people
1982 births
Democratic Republic of the Congo footballers
Democratic Republic of the Congo international footballers
SC Cilu players
AS Vita Club players
FC Saint-Éloi Lupopo players
Association football defenders
2006 Africa Cup of Nations players
Democratic Republic of the Congo expatriate footballers
Expatriate footballers in Germany
Democratic Republic of the Congo expatriate sportspeople in Germany
21st-century Democratic Republic of the Congo people